The Colegio Español Federico García Lorca is a Spanish government-operated school for children from 3 to 12 years old in Paris, France that teaches in Spanish language, French language and English language. It is located at 53 Rue de la Pompe in the 16th arrondissement. It is affiliated to the institute Liceo Español Luis Buñuel, in the Paris area.

As of the 2015–2016 school year, 79.6% of the school's 221 students were Spanish nationals.

References

External links
 Colegio Español Federico García Lorca 
 Colegio Español Federico García Lorca 

Schools in Paris